Sultan Abdul Aziz Shah Golf and Country Club, formerly known as Kelab Golf Sultan Abdul Aziz Shah, is a golf course in Shah Alam, Selangor, Malaysia. The three 9-hole loops were designed by Australian five-time Open champion Peter Thomson.

References

Golf clubs and courses in Malaysia
Shah Alam
Sports venues in Selangor